Shaun Bodiford (born May 4, 1982 in Federal Way, Washington) is a former American football wide receiver. He was signed by the Detroit Lions as an undrafted free agent in 2006. He played college football at Portland State.

Bodiford has a drink named after him in Portland, OR named the Shaun Claw’d Van Damme at Tryon Creek Bar & Grill.

Bodiford has also been a member of the Green Bay Packers, Washington Redskins, New York Giants and Oakland Raiders.

External links
New York Giants bio
Oakland Raiders bio 

1982 births
Living people
American football return specialists
American football wide receivers
Butte Roadrunners football players
Portland State Vikings football players
Detroit Lions players
Green Bay Packers players
Washington Redskins players
New York Giants players
Oakland Raiders players
People from Federal Way, Washington
Players of American football from Wisconsin